Ivan Krstanović (born 5 January 1983) is a Croatian football striker who plays for Slaven Belupo in the Croatian First Football League. He became known in Croatia when he became the top scorer of the Prva HNL in the 2010–11 season with 19 goals.

Career statistics

Club

Honours

Club
Dinamo Zagreb
Croatian First Football League: 2011–12, 2012–13
Croatian Cup: 2011–12

Rijeka
Croatian Cup: 2013–14
Croatian Supercup: 2014

Široki Brijeg
Bosnia and Herzegovina Cup: 2016–17

Individual
Awards 
Sportske novosti Yellow Shirt award: 2011 
Performance 
Prva HNL Player of the Season: 2010–11

References

External links

1983 births
Living people
People from Tomislavgrad
Croats of Bosnia and Herzegovina
Association football forwards
Bosnia and Herzegovina footballers
Croatian footballers
HŠK Posušje players
NK Zagreb players
GNK Dinamo Zagreb players
HNK Rijeka players
NK Zadar players
NK Široki Brijeg players
NK Lokomotiva Zagreb players
NK Slaven Belupo players
Croatian Football League players
Premier League of Bosnia and Herzegovina players
Bosnia and Herzegovina expatriate footballers
Croatian expatriate footballers